Winter Kept Us Warm is a Canadian romantic drama film, released in 1965. The title comes from the fifth line of T.S. Eliot's The Waste Land.

An independent film written, directed, and funded by David Secter, it occupies a unique place in the history of Canadian cinema as the first English-language Canadian film screened at the Cannes Film Festival. The film was screened at the 1966 festival during the Semaine de la critique, a special non-competitive portion of the festival at which works of new filmmakers are shown. Its debut was as the opening film of the Commonwealth Film Festival in Cardiff, Wales on September 27, 1965.

The film stars John Labow as Doug Harris and Henry Tarvainen as Peter Saarinen, two very different students at the University of Toronto, who develop a complex quasi-romantic friendship, and Joy Tepperman and Janet Amos as their girlfriends Bev and Sandra. The film's gay subtext was carefully coded by Secter, who wrote the film based on his own experience falling in love with a male fellow student, but feared that a more explicitly gay film would not attract an audience. Even some of the film's cast have claimed in interviews that they did not know at the time that the film was actually about homosexuality.

Production
The film received a $750 grant from the University of Toronto Students' Union, along with permission to film several key scenes at Hart House; however, Secter had to fight the university administration for permission to film in other locations on campus. As well, the film was declined production grants from the Canada Council, the Ontario Arts Council and the National Film Board of Canada. Secter found much of the cast by placing a classified advertisement in the university's student newspaper The Varsity; however, for technical crew he largely had to go to Ryerson Polytechnic's film studies department.

According to Secter, "at the time I made it the very idea of making movies in Canada was an alien concept". His only prior film experience was the eight-minute short film Love with the Proper Guppy. Having been a film reviewer for The Varsity, he has stated that he was inspired by the French New Wave: "A lot of those New Wave guys had started out as critics, and I thought, ‘Hey, if they can move from talking about movies to making movies, why can’t I?’"

Critical response
The film was given a Special Jury Award at the Festival of Canadian Films in Montreal.

Frank Morriss of The Globe and Mail noticed the "overtones of homosexuality" in Doug and Peter's friendship. He reviewed the film positively overall, writing that "when the two fall into a casual relationship, Labow's accent on having a good time, and Tarvainen's earnest desire to make good, has interest. It is when Tarvainen gains confidence and Labow's emotional feelings begin to run amuck, that the movie begins to go down the drain, and lose direction." He ultimately concluded, however, that the film "has enough in its favour to deserve the patronage of film fans who want to see what a group of university students can do with the challenge of a feature movie."

Writing about the film for The Body Politic in 1982, Thomas Waugh expressed concern about the fact that gay-themed films of its era rarely depicted positive same-sex relationships, but instead usually centred on love triangles involving a woman; while acknowledging that Winter Kept Us Warm reflected this trope, he complimented the film for portraying its women characters with greater integrity than usual for the genre.

Legacy 
Although not widely remembered among the general public, Winter Kept Us Warm is considered a major milestone in the Canadian film industry as one of the first Canadian films ever to attract international attention. Secter made a second film, The Offering, in 1966, one of the first Canadian films to depict an interracial romance. Secter subsequently moved to the United States. In 1976, he directed the low budget sex comedy Getting Together, but subsequently left the film industry.

The film was screened at the 1984 Festival of Festivals as part of Front & Centre, a special retrospective program of artistically and culturally significant films from throughout the history of Canadian cinema.

In the 1990s, Secter's nephew Joel Secter rented Getting Together, not knowing that his uncle had directed films. Seeing David's name in the credits, Joel contacted his uncle to talk about his film career. Those discussions ultimately led to Joel Secter's own debut as a filmmaker, the 2005 documentary The Best of Secter and the Rest of Secter. Notable figures who discussed Secter and Winter Kept Us Warm in the documentary included David Cronenberg, Michael Ondaatje, Philip Glass, Ed Mirvish and Lloyd Kaufman.

The film was released on DVD by TLA Video in early 2011.

In 2015, the film was screened at Buddies in Bad Times during Toronto's Pride Week as the centrepiece of a selection of LGBT-themed Canadian films, to mark the launch of Thomas Waugh's Queer Media Database project.

References

External links 
 

1965 films
1965 independent films
1965 LGBT-related films
1965 romantic drama films
Canadian black-and-white films
Canadian romantic drama films
Canadian independent films
Canadian LGBT-related films
English-language Canadian films
Films directed by David Secter
Films set in Toronto
Films set in universities and colleges
Films shot in Toronto
LGBT history in Canada
LGBT-related romantic drama films
1965 directorial debut films
Canadian student films
1960s English-language films
1960s Canadian films